Albert Street is a street in central Riga known for its Art Nouveau buildings. It was built in 1901 and named after Bishop Albert, who founded Riga in 1201.

Many of the apartment buildings along the street were designed by the architect Mikhail Eisenstein, who was particularly active in Riga at the beginning of the twentieth century. His creativity is reflected through the various atypical, decorative buildings along Albert street. The architectural style makes use of structural and decorative elements of romantic nationalism common to northern Europe at the time. Konstantīns Pēkšēns and Eižens Laube, a teacher and his pupil respectively, were prominent in building design on the street at the same time. Other authors of buildings of Alberta iela include Baltic and Baltic German architects Paul Mandelstamm, Hermann Hilbig and Heinrich Scheel.

Since April 2009 Pēkšēns' former residence at number 12 has housed the Riga Art Nouveau Museum. The embassies of Belgium and Ireland are also located on Alberta iela.

Notable buildings

See also
 Art Nouveau architecture in Riga

References

External links
 

Buildings and structures in Riga
Art Nouveau architecture in Riga
Streets in Riga